Zarateana rocandioi is a species of air-breathing land snail, a terrestrial pulmonate gastropod mollusk in the family Geomitridae.

Distribution

This species occurs in Spain.

References

rocandioi
Gastropods described in 1950